Rick and Morty – Worlds Apart is a limited series graphic novel, written by Josh Trujillo, illustrated by Tony Fleecs & Jarrett Williams, and colored by Leonardo Ito, which was published in four parts in 2021 by Oni Press, based on the fourth season of self-titled television series by Justin Roiland and Dan Harmon, and specifically serving as a direct sequel to the 2019 episodes "Edge of Tomorty: Rick Die Rickpeat" by Mike McMahan and "Claw and Hoarder: Special Ricktim's Morty" by Jeff Loveness, as well as a continuation of the 2013 first season episode "Anatomy Park" by Eric Acosta and Wade Randolph.

Tonally described as having "a heightened sense of surrealism and mania", Part One was released on February 3; Part Two was released on March 3; Part Three was released on April 7; and Part Four was released on May 5 (all in 2021). The series' dragons were later made available as playable characters in the free-to-play role-playing video game Pocket Mortys.

Receiving a positive critical reception, the series was collected as an omnibus in September 2021.

Overview
Sometime after the events of "Claw and Hoarder: Special Ricktim's Morty", the dragon Balthromaw returns seeking Rick Sanchez's and Morty Smith's assistance in defeating the evil Lady Finndom and her energy-zapping Dragon Drainers. Not wanting to be involved in a "sequel", Rick declines and goes on vacation instead, leaving an visiting Grampa Leonard Smith (Jerry's father, from "Anatomy Park") to attempt to save the dragons himself, much to Morty's chagrin. Meanwhile, as Rick goes on vacation to a pocket universe (as in "The Ricks Must Be Crazy"), he finds it disrupted by Fascist Teddy Bear Rick (one of the alternate universe fascist versions of him from "Edge of Tomorty: Rick Die Rickpeat"), both having accidentally double-booked the area via inter-dimensional mishap, begrudgingly dividing it amongst themselves before going to war.

Premise

Part One
Picking up where season four of Rick and Morty left off, see the outrageous Balthromaw and his dragons embroil in a tantalising adventure where only Morty (and Grampa Leonard) can save them. And when none other than Fascist Teddy Bear Rick shows up to ruin Rick's plan for the perfect vacation, no one is safe!

Part Two
It's a world-building-bake off…at UNIVERSAL SCALE! As millennia pass in the pocket universe, Rick and Fascist Teddy Bear Rick engage one another in a scientific wager to create (different forms of) utopia, while Morty and Grandpa Leonard engage in a wild adventure to save all dragon-kind.

Part Three
One universe goes to war…the other goes shopping? It's Pocket World War I, as each Rick is one-upping another's armies in an overly petty game of cat and mouse. The ones who suffer the most from the created citizens of each Rick's civilisation, who are afraid of upsetting the Ricks. At least, most of them are… Meanwhile, Morty, Leonard, and the dragons are on the hunt for the mythical "Dragon Toys".

Part Four
As Rick and Fascist Teddy Bear Rick reluctantly unite against their creations, Leonard gets a very special title from the dragons.

Development
Announced in October 2020 for a February 2021 premiere, given free reign by Oni Press to write a sequel to any Rick and Morty episode of his choosing, Josh Trujillo stated that "the moment he saw Balthromaw and his sensual dragon warriors [in Jeff Loveness' fourth season episode "Claw and Hoarder: Special Ricktim's Morty" that] he knew exactly what story he wanted to tell", describing the miniseries as "something that lives up the comedy and insanity of the [animated] series", with "the kinkiest team of super-villains to ever grace a comic-book page". Series' artist Jarrett Williams considered the series "the best project to have [done] during quarantine [with] some really ambitious comic layouts", while supporting artist Tony Fleecs described the premise of the series as a whole as:

"I love when licensed comics take characters you saw for a SPLIT second in a show or movie and then tell a giant story about just that one character [and] when tiny characters get to have a whole life outside of the show. We're doing that in this book with not one but TWO beloved 'featured extras' and also there's just a ton of super horny dragons."

Reception

Reviewing the series, Gizmodo complimented the "grounded sort of reunion [between Grampa Leonard and the Smith family that nonetheless brings out the worst in both Rick and Morty", while Bubbleblabbber described the series as "one of the best miniseries spin-offs of the franchise in some time [with its] utilization of known characters intermixed in a pair of new plots [pleasing] fans old and new alike [while] satisfying[ly] pack[ing] the pages full of exciting concepts and actions [and the] underl[ying] familial relationships manag[ing] to tie this whole miniseries together. Morty needed to spend the one-on-one time with his other grandfather to discover his value. While Rick needed to come to terms with his emotions in his own way. So, while their adventures were literally worlds apart, the goal for both was the same: they each needed to overcome their apprehension with Leonard", concluding that:

The wars with dragons, soul swallowers, fascist teddy bears, and pocket universes were all built around a solid emotional tale. The epic adventures kept us entertained but were nothing more than vessels for a story much more grounded. It helps to separate this miniseries from many of the other Rick and Morty comic books available. It found and mended a hole from the original series that may never be touched upon. And the focus was on telling this story in a universe of science fiction and fantasy instead of shoehorning it in. If more comic adaptations of televised sitcoms put this amount of thought and effort into them, they wouldn’t be disappearing at the rate they have been these past few years. Worlds Apart managed to pick out some highlights from the franchise while adding some great insights and new directions. These books help to accentuate the franchise instead of just cherry-picking a theme and style. This was a pretty impressive little four-book series. Especially when you consider the [source] material they are working with and the audience they are aiming for. But I would happily read a hundred book series with this much thought and effort.

Collected editions

References

External links
 Rick and Morty – Worlds Apart at Oni Press

2021 graphic novels
Worlds Apart
Oni Press titles
Sequel comics
Books about dragons